GuestReady is a property management company headquartered in Trogen, Switzerland. Founded in 2016, it is active in Europe, Middle East and Southeast Asia. It helps hosts manage their properties on online rental marketplaces such as Airbnb.

The GuestReady Group offers short-term rental management via the brands GuestReady, Oporto City Flats, and We Stay In Paris. GuestReady focuses on Airbnb management, which includes services such as Customer-relationship management, revenue management, Marketing channel management, guest Check-in, facility and laundry services. The group also offers Business-to-business services and distributes the Information technology system as BnbLord to other property managers that intend to offer short-term rental management to their clients.

The group is active in Europe, Middle East and Asia. It offers property management as GuestReady in the United Kingdom (London, Manchester, Edinburgh), France (Paris, Cannes, Lyon, Bordeaux), Portugal (Lisbon, Porto), United Arab Emirates (Dubai), Malaysia (Kuala Lumpur) and Hong Kong. GuestReady offered Airbnb-management in Singapore between 2016 and 2018 but decided to pull out of the market due to changes in regulation of short-lets in Singapore.

History
GuestReady was founded in April 2016 by Alexander Limpert (CEO), Christian Mischler (Executive Chairman) and Patrick Degen (CFO).

In summer 2017, European competitor Easy Rental Services was acquired and GuestReady announced a seed round of US$3 million, led by the Russian fund Impulse VC. In December 2018, GuestReady acquired Portugal-based Oporto City Flats. At the same time, GuestReady took over the management of the property portfolio of We Stay In Paris, a local competitor in France.

In April 2019, GuestReady acquired BnbLord, the largest short-term rental management company in France and Portugal by delivering Airbnb management on a portfolio of 1,000 properties. The founders of BnbLord, Léo Bonnet, Jacques Lavie, François Lavie, joined the GuestReady Group in senior management positions.

In parallel to the BnbLord acquisition, GuestReady created an umbrella brand called GuestReady Group. It reported a portfolio of more than 4,000 properties.

Notes

References

External links
 

Hospitality services
Property management companies
Hospitality companies of Switzerland
Real estate companies established in 2016
2016 establishments in Switzerland